AZT (azidothymidine) or zidovudine is an antiretroviral drug used to treat HIV/AIDS.

AZT or azt may also refer to:
 Azerbaijan Time, a time zone
 Aztreonam, an antibiotic drug
 Atta language's ISO 639 code